Mia vradia me tin Marinella (Greek: Μια βραδιά με την Μαρινέλλα) is the name of the first live album by popular Greek singer Marinella. It was released on 16 March 1972 by PolyGram Records in Greece. Marinella was the first Greek woman to record a live album during her performance at the “Stork”, a popular night club in Athens, Greece, in 1971.

The album was re-issued on a double compilation album, together with the 1973 album Mia Vradia Me Tin Marinella No. 2, in 1988 by PolyGram. This compilation was released on a 2-CD set in the 1990s. 
In 2007, Universal Music Greece granted a licensed re-release to Athens-based Espresso newspaper for their Chrysi Diskothiki (Golden Record Library), the re-release contained the same tracks as the original compilation album.

Track listing 
Side One.
"Piretos" (Πυρετός; Fever) – (Akis Panou) – 3:43
"Simvivazomaste" (Συμβιβαζόμαστε; We're compromising) – (Giorgos Hadjinasios - Tasos Economou) – 3:42
"Enan kero" (Έναν καιρό; One time) – (Christos Leontis - Sotia Tsotou) – 2:54
"23 Aprilides" (23 Απρίληδες; 23 Aprils) – (Nakis Petridis - Sevi Tiliakou) – 2:51
 "Ki' ego de milisa" (Κι' εγώ δε μίλησα; And I spoke not) – (Nakis Petridis - Sevi Tiliakou) – 3:21
 "Nichtoperpatimata" (Νυχτοπερπατήματα; Nightlife) – (Giorgos Hadjinasios - Tasos Economou) – 2:25
Side Two.
 "Akouste" (Ακούστε; Harken) – (Giorgos Katsaros - Pythagoras) – 3:08
 "Erini" (Ερήνη; Irene) – (Kostas Giannidis - Mimis Traiforos, adaptation by Giorgos Petsilas) – 3:01
 "Oute matia dakrismena" (Ούτε μάτια δακρυσμένα; Eyes without tears) – (Giorgos Katsaros - Pythagoras) – 3:01
 "O Nontas" (Ο Νώντας; Nondas) – (Giannis Spanos - Sotia Tsotou) – 4:02
 "Pot pourri" (Ποτ πουρί; Medley) – 4:50
 "Piso apo tis kalamies (Instrumental intro)" (Πίσω από τις καλαμιές; Behind the reeds) – (Giorgos Katsaros - Pythagoras)
 "Pali tha klapso" (Πάλι θα κλάψω; Again, I will cry) – (Nakis Petridis - Sevi Tiliakou)
 "Apopse se thelo" (Απόψε σε θέλω; Tonight I want you) – (Mimis Plessas - Lefteris Papadopoulos)
 "Ama dite to feggari" (Άμα δείτε το φεγγάρι; Should you see the moon) – (Mimis Plessas - Lefteris Papadopoulos)
 "Ti na ftei" (Τι να φταίει; What is wrong) – (Giorgos Zambetas - Dimitris Christodoulou)
 "Apopse chano mia psychi" (Απόψε χάνω μια ψυχή; Tonight I'm losing a soul) – (Giorgos Katsaros - Pythagoras)
 "I antres den klene" (Οι άντρες δεν κλαίνε; Men don't cry) – (Giorgos Katsaros - Pythagoras)
 "Anixe petra" (Άνοιξε πέτρα; Open, stone) – (Mimis Plessas - Lefteris Papadopoulos)

Personnel 
 Marinella - vocals
 Marios Kostoglou - background vocals on tracks 3, 4, 6, 7, 8 and 9
 Philippos Papatheodorou - producer 
 Yiannis Smyrneos - recording engineer

References

1972 live albums
Greek-language albums
Marinella live albums
Universal Music Greece albums